Capulus ungaricus, common name the bonnet shell, is a species of medium-sized sea snail, a marine gastropod mollusk in the family Capulidae, the cap snails.

Taxonomy
The original name of this species is Capulus ungaricus (Linnaeus, 1758). Later on, a few authors (e.g. Jeffreys, 1865, Thorson, 1941, Ziegelmeier, 1966, Lindner, 1977) changed the name erroneously in Capulus hungaricus. The correct date of publication is 1758 and not 1767 as Abbott (1974) and Lindner (1977) cited.

Distribution
The distribution of Capulus ungaricus includes the sea off Greenland to off Florida. It is less common in the North Sea.

Description 
The maximum recorded shell length is 50 mm.

Habitat 
Minimum recorded depth is 1 m. Maximum recorded depth is 838 m. It is known also from seamounts and knolls.

Feeding habits 
It is a suspension feeder.

References
This article incorporates CC-BY-SA-3.0 text from the reference 

 Gofas, S.; Le Renard, J.; Bouchet, P. (2001). Mollusca. in: Costello, M.J. et al. (eds), European Register of Marine Species: a check-list of the marine species in Europe and a bibliography of guides to their identification. Patrimoines Naturels. 50: 180–213

External links
 

Capulidae
Gastropods described in 1758
Taxa named by Carl Linnaeus